CLM may refer to:

Business
 CH2M Hill, Laing O'Rourke and Mace, a joint venture appointed by the Olympic Delivery Authority to manage the delivery of the Olympic Park and its associated infrastructure for the London 2012 Olympic Games
 CLM Entertainment, a British artist management company formed by Colin Lester
 Configuration lifecycle management, the management of all configuration definitions and configurations across all involved business processes applied throughout the lifecycle of a product
 Contract lifecycle management
 Customer lifecycle management, the measurement of multiple customer related metrics, which, when analyzed for a period of time, indicate the performance of a business
 Closed-loop manufacturing, a closed-loop process of manufacturing and measuring in the manufacturing machine
Canadian Line Materials, a Civil Defense Siren manufacturer

Science, technology and medicine
 Channel length modulation
 Committee on Copyright and other Legal Matters, a strategic programme of the International Federation of Library Associations and Institutions
 Common Lisp Music, a "music synthesis and signal processing package in the Music V family"
 Conservation of linear momentum
 Cutaneous larva migrans, a form of tropically acquired dermatosis, also known as creeping eruption, plumber's itch, or sandworm disease

Transport
 Collingham railway station, England, by National Rail station code
 William R. Fairchild International Airport, in Port Angeles, Washington, United States, by IATA airport code

Other uses
 Castile-La Mancha, an autonomous community of Spain
 Christian Life Movement, a lay ecclesial movement of the Catholic Church
 Colombia, ITU country code
 Codex latinus monacensis, the holdings of Latin manuscripts in the Bayerische Staatsbibliothek in Munich
 Contre la Montre, the French term for an individual time trial in road bicycle racing
 CLM P1/01, a Le Mans Prototype racing car